College Street is a 900 metre long street in Central Kolkata in the Indian state of West Bengal. Also known as Boi Para (Bengali: বইপাড়া;  Book Town), it stretches from Bidhan Sarani road up to Bowbazar (before Nirmal Chandra Street) via MG Road  crossing and Surya Sen Street crossing. Its name derives from the presence of numerous colleges and universities like University of Calcutta, Calcutta Medical College, Presidency University, The Sanskrit College and University, City College of Commerce and Business Administration, Goenka College of Commerce and Business Administration etc. The road houses many centres of intellectual activity especially the Indian Coffee House, a café that has attracted the city's intelligentsia for decades. College Street is the largest book market in India as well as Asia and the largest secondhand book market in the whole world.

Book stores
The College Street is famous for its small and big book stores, which gives it the nickname Boi Para (Colony of Books). People from the whole city and different parts of the state flock the innumerable book stores along the side-walk for books. Many bigwigs of the Bengali publication industry (like: Ananda Publishers, Mitra and Ghosh Publishers, DasGupta and Company Pvt. Ltd, Dey's Publishing, Rupa & Co., Asha Book Agency etc.) are situated here. The street is also dotted with countless small book kiosks which sell new and old books. An article in the journal Smithsonian described College Street as ...a half-mile of bookshops and bookstalls spilling over onto the pavement, carrying first editions, pamphlets, paperbacks in every Indian language, with more than a fair smattering of books in and out of print from France, Germany, Russia and England.
One can buy rare books at throw-away prices and extensive bargaining takes place.

Recognition

In 2007, College Street featured among the famous landmarks of India which have made it to 6pm to 9pm Magazine's "Best of Asia" list.

Educational institutes

Well-known academic institutions situated on this street include
 Presidency University,  established in 1817, making it one of the oldest educational institutions of western education in South Asia.
 University of Calcutta, established in 1857 and one of the first major multidisciplinary university in South Asia.
 Medical College and Hospital, Kolkata, established in 1835,  first college of European medicine in Asia.
 The Sanskrit College and University, established in 1824, and Sanskrit Collegiate School.
 Indian Institute of Social Welfare and Business Management, established in 1953, affiliated to University of Calcutta. It is India's first MBA offering institute.
 Hare School, established in 1818.
 Hindu School, established in 1817.

Gallery

References

External links

 College Street in Maps of India

Streets in Kolkata